Guy Poitevin (born 19 October 1927 in Entrains-sur-Nohain (Nièvre), died 2 December 2008) was a French footballer and manager.

A very tall (1m 81) defender, he played for Lille, before a brilliant career at Nice. With the aiglons, he won the Cup-League double in 1952, won the Cup again in 1954 and the Championship again in 1956.

Honours 
 French Champion 1952 and 1956 with OGC Nice
 League runners-up 1950 and 1951 with Lille OSC
 Winner of the Coupe de France 1952 and 1954 with OGC Nice
 Latin Cup finalist 1951 with Lille OSC

References 

 

French footballers
Lille OSC players
OGC Nice players
Ligue 1 players
French football managers
Lille OSC managers
1927 births
2008 deaths
Association football defenders